Beshtau (from Turkic beş 'five' and tau 'mountain') is an isolated five-domed  igneous mountain (volcano) near Pyatigorsk (after the Russian term Pyatigorye 'area of five mountains') in the Northern Caucasus.

The slopes are forested with ash, oak, hornbeam, and beech deciduous forests, and the summit is treeless. Beshtau used to have uranium mines, which were closed in 1975.

See also
Mashuk

External links

References 

Mountains of Russia
Landforms of Stavropol Krai
Mountains of the Caucasus